Argyrotaenia artocopa is a species of moth of the family Tortricidae. It is found from Mexico and Costa Rica to Ecuador and Venezuela.

References

Moths described in 1932
artocopa
Moths of North America
Moths of South America